Roaring Brook I Site and Roaring Brook II Site are two Middle to Late Woodland Period archeological sites in East Haddam, Connecticut, that were listed on the National Register of Historic Places in 1987.

The Roaring Brook cultural phase, associated with multiple sites in the vicinity, is dated to 2000–1250 BP (AD 1–750).

Both National Register listings are for areas of less than one acre. Surveys conducted during the 1980s located these, as well as other sites in the lower Connecticut Valley.

See also
National Register of Historic Places listings in Middlesex County, Connecticut

References

Further reading
McBride, Kevin. 1984. Prehistory of the Lower Connecticut River Valley. Unpublished dissertation, University of Connecticut, Storrs, Connecticut.

National Register of Historic Places in Middlesex County, Connecticut
Geography of Middlesex County, Connecticut
Archaeological sites in Connecticut
East Haddam, Connecticut
Woodland period
Archaeological sites on the National Register of Historic Places in Connecticut